Madhu Ambat is an Indian cinematographer. With a career spanning over 40 years, he is one of the most prolific cinematographers in Indian cinema. He is best known for his work in films such as Amaram, Anjali, and Makaramanju. He currently resides in Chennai, Tamil Nadu. He has won the National Film Award for Best Cinematography thrice. He is a member of the Indian Society of Cinematographers (ISC).

Personal life

Madhu Ambat was born on 6 March 1949 in Ernakulam to Ambat Sulochana and Prof  K. Bhagyanath and he is the grandson of Ambat Sivarama Menon. He is a graduate and holds a diploma from the Film Institute of India, Poona, from where he graduated in 1973, securing a gold medal.

Madhu's father, K. Bhagyanath, resigned as a Professor of English to be a full-time magician. Bhagyanath was also an amateur photographer. Bhagyanath and his wife Sulochana believed that one should take the profession one liked best. Madhu got admission in IIT and at the same time he selected in Pune Film Institute. Despite of all hindrances from the relatives, Madhu's parents allowed him to join in the Film institute, and he sustained the faith of his parents on him by achieving a gold medal at the institute. And all these helped Madhu take cinematography as his profession. Madhu, who started his career with a documentary for famous director Ramu Kariat, has been cinematographer for over 120 films. His younger sister is the renowned actress and dancer Vidhubala.

Career

After graduating from the Pune Film Institute, Madhu Ambat entered the film industry in 1973, photographing a documentary for Ramu Kariat. In a career spread over 35 years, he has been the cinematographer for a number of notable films winning many awards.

Ambat also heads a non-profit making research organization "Fantasia Centre for Research and Development of Cinema". This newly started organization strives to develop an atmosphere for research in cinema and to spread a film culture.

In 2003, he completed 1:1.6 An Ode to Lost Love, his debut film as a director.

Filmography

1975 - Love Letter
1977 - Njaaval Pazhangal as Madhu-Shaji
1978 -  Manushyan  as Madhu-Shaji
1978 - Kudhira Motte 
1978 - Nalegannu Maduvavaru
1978 -  Prema Kama 
1978 -  Ithihasa 
1978 - Saritha
1978 - Ashwathama
1978 - Yaro Oral
1979 - Hridhayathil Nee Mathram
1979 - Pichipoo 
1980 - Oppol
1980 - Saraswathi Yaamam
1980 - Sooryante Maranum
1980 - Seetha
1982 - Lahari as Madhu-Shaji
1983 - Adi Shankaracharya
1983 - Phaniyamma
1984 - Sandhya Mayangum Neram
1984 - ‘ ‘Swantham Sarika ‘’
1986 - Tabarana Kathe
1986 - Uppu
1987 - Swathi Thirunal
1988 - Vaishali
1989 - Vachanam
1990 - Anjali
1990 - Disha
1990 - Sutradhaarulu
1991 - Amaram
1992 - Daivathinte Vikrithikal
1992 - Praying with Anger
1992 - Swaroopam
1993 - Bhagvad Gita
1993 - Magrib
1993 - Padheyam
1994 - Nammavar
1994 - Swami Vivekananda
1994 - Amodini
1997 - Churam
1997 - Kulam
1997 - Bapa
1999 - Khoobsurat
1999 - Thammudu
2000 - Badri
2001 - Lajja
2003 - Anyar
2003 - Chupke Se
2004 - Chanakya
2004 - 1:1.6 An Ode to Lost Love
2004 - Pravahi (Documentary short)
2005 - June R
2006 - Aadum Koothu
2006 - Provoked: A True Story
2007 - Shoot on Sight
2007 - Sringaram
2008 - Maan Gaye Mughal-e-Azam
2009 - Kerala Cafe (segment "Makal")
2010 - Graamam
2010 - Hisss
2010 - Makaramanju
2011 - Adaminte Makan Abu
2012 - Kalikaalam
2013 - Kunjananthante Kada
2013 - Thee Kulikkum Pachai Maram
2014 - Namma Gramam
2014 - Sivappu
2015 - Pathemari
2018 - Pani - Fever
2018 - And the Oscar Goes To...
2020 - Itlu Amma

Awards
National Film Awards
 1984: Best Cinematography - Adi Sankaracharya (Sanskrit)
 2006: Best Cinematography - Sringaram (Tamil)
 2010: Best Cinematography - Adaminte Makan Abu (Malayalam)

Kerala State Film Awards
 1978: Aswathama, Sooryante Maranam and Yaro Oral
 1987: Purushartham, Swathi Thirunal
 1990: Amaram
 2018: Pani, And the Oscar Goes To

Nandi Awards
 1990: Nandi Award for Best Cinematographer - Hrudayanjali 

South Indian International Movie Awards
 2012: SIIMA Award for Best Cinematographer - Makaramanju

Asianet Film Awards
 2012: Best Cinematographer - Adaminte Makan Abu
 2013 - Asiavision Awards - Best Cinematographer

References

External links
Official website

Living people
Best Cinematography National Film Award winners
Kerala State Film Award winners
Kannada film cinematographers
1949 births
Tamil film cinematographers
Film and Television Institute of India alumni
Malayalam film cinematographers
Film directors from Kochi
Malayalam film directors
20th-century Indian film directors
21st-century Indian film directors
20th-century Indian photographers
21st-century Indian photographers
Cinematographers from Kerala